Axieme is a live album by the saxophonist Steve Lacy. It was released in 1975 on Red Records. Although not labelled on the LP or CD releases, the album contains solo tracks of Steve Lacy's compositions "Deadline", "The New Duck", "Tao (Suite)", "Coastline" and "The Crust".

Track listing
All compositions by Steve Lacy.
 "Axieme, Pt. 1 & 2" - 24:01 
 "Axieme, Pt. 3 & 4" - 25:09

Personnel
Steve Lacy - soprano saxophone

References

Red Records albums
1975 albums
Steve Lacy (saxophonist) albums